Adelyn Bushnell Bradford (September 29, 1889 in Thomaston, Maine – September 1, 1953 in Los Angeles, California) was an American stage actress, playwright, novelist and radio script writer active in the first half of the 20th century. She was also once a member of the Jefferson Theater Stock Company in Portland.

Biography 
Bushnell was born in Thomaston, Maine, in 1889. She was home-schooled until she entered high school. In 1908, she graduated from Thomaston High School.

Career 
Bushnell had her first starring role in a play in 1911 and she continued to play until 1926.

Novels 
Source:
 Tide Rode (1947)
 Eight Radio Plays: For Classroom Use And Amateur Broadcast with Marshall Bradford (1947)
 Rock Haven (1948)
 Pay the Piper: A Novel (1950)
 Strange Gift (1950)

References

20th-century American novelists
20th-century American dramatists and playwrights
20th-century American women writers
Actresses from Maine
American women novelists
Novelists from Maine
People from Thomaston, Maine
1889 births
1953 deaths